The Cameroonian Basketball Cup (in French: Coupe du Cameroon de Basketball) is an annual basketball cup competition contested in Cameroon. The competition is organised by the Cameroon Basketball Federation (Fécabasket).

Winners

Titles by team

References 

Basketball cup competitions in Africa
Basketball in Cameroon